Justin Robert Meccage (\MESS-ij\) (born February 10, 1980) is an American professional baseball coach. He is the bullpen coach for the Pittsburgh Pirates of Major League Baseball (MLB).

Career
Meccage attended Oklahoma State University, and played college baseball for the Oklahoma State Cowboys. The New York Yankees selected him in the 32nd round of the 2002 MLB draft, and he played for the Staten Island Yankees and Cook County Cheetahs in 2002 and 2003 before shifting into coaching. He served as an assistant coach, recruiting coordinator and pitching coach for the University of Texas–Pan American from 2004 to 2007. He then served as the pitching coach for Arkansas State University from 2007 through 2010. He joined the Pittsburgh Pirates organization in 2011 and served as a pitching coach at various level through 2016. He served as the Pirates Minor League Pitching Coordinator in 2017.

In 2018, the Pirates elevated Meccage to their major league coaching staff as the assistant pitching coach. Meccage was made the Pirates bullpen coach prior to the 2020 season.

Personal life
Meccage's father Bob, who was a college pitching coach, died during Justin's senior year of college. His brother Jeremy is also a college pitching coach. Meccage and his wife Stacee have three sons.

References

External links

Pirates coaching bio

1980 births
Living people
Sportspeople from Billings, Montana
Baseball coaches from Montana
Baseball players from Montana
Baseball pitchers
Major League Baseball bullpen coaches
Major League Baseball pitching coaches
Pittsburgh Pirates coaches
Oklahoma State Cowboys baseball players
Staten Island Yankees players
Cook County Cheetahs players
UT Rio Grande Valley Vaqueros baseball coaches
Arkansas State Red Wolves baseball coaches
Minor league baseball coaches
Oklahoma State University alumni